Yannick Jadot (born 27 July 1967) is a French environmentalist and politician who has served as a Member of the European Parliament (MEP) since the 2009 European election, representing the West France constituency.

Early career
As an environmentalist and humanitarian, Jadot coordinated Greenpeace actions in France between 2002 and 2008, also heading the Alliance pour la planète and serving as a key player in the 2008 Grenelle Environnement talks.

Political career
In 2009, Jadot announced that he was leaving Greenpeace to lead the Europe Ecology list in the West France constituency in the 2009 European elections. His list won 16.65% of the vote and he was elected to the European Parliament, along with Nicole Kiil-Nielsen. He was reelected to the same constituency during the 2014 European elections.

In parliament, Jadot first served on the Committee on International Trade from 2009 until 2019. Since 2019, he has been a member of the Committee on the Environment, Public Health and Food Safety.

In addition to his committee assignments, Jadot was part of the Parliament's delegations to the countries of Southeast Asia and the Association of Southeast Asian Nations (2014–2019), and to the ACP–EU Joint Parliamentary Assembly (2009–2011). He is also a member of the European Parliament Intergroup on the Welfare and Conservation of Animals and the European Parliament Intergroup on LGBT Rights.

In 2016, Jadot was selected by Europe Ecology – The Greens (EELV) to stand as their candidate in the 2017 French presidential election, after defeating fellow MEP Michèle Rivasi in the second round of primary voting. Though Jadot secured 496 sponsorships just before the opening of the signature collection period, he announced that he would withdraw his candidacy and endorsed Socialist nominee Benoît Hamon, the pair having agreed on a common platform. Their alliance was consummated when EELV primary voters approved the agreement on 26 February 2017.

On 30 January 2021, Jadot announced that he would be running as a candidate in the 2022 French presidential election. In the primaries, he won 51.03% of the party's votes, beating Sandrine Rousseau. In the first round of the election on 10 April 2022, he was eliminated after he received 4.6% of the overall votes, coming in 6th place behind Valerie Pecresse

Jadot said in April 2022 that he wanted to put a “bonus/malus” system on "all taxation", from VAT to wealth tax (ISF) which he intends to “restore” and ”to strengthen”.

Publications
Jadot's 2014 book, Climat, la guerre de l'ombre, was illustrated by comic artist and author Léo Quievreux.

References

1967 births
Living people
Paris Dauphine University alumni
Europe Ecology – The Greens MEPs
French humanitarians
French people of Belgian descent
MEPs for West France 2014–2019
MEPs for France 2019–2024
People associated with Greenpeace
People from Aisne
Politicians from Hauts-de-France
Candidates in the 2022 French presidential election